Vedantu is an Indian online tutoring platform launched in 2014 based in Bengaluru, India.

History 
The company was launched in 2014. Its name Vedantu is derivative Sanskrit words Veda (knowledge) and Tantu (network). The organization is run by IIT alumni Vamsi Krishna (co-founder & CEO), Pulkit Jain (co-founder and head of product), Saurabh Saxena (co-founder) and Anand Prakash (co-founder and head of academics). Earlier, the team founded Lakshya, which was acquired by MT Educare (a subsidiary of Zee Learn) in the year 2012.

It primarily provides services to students from grades 4 to 12 of Indian Certificate of Secondary Education (ICSE) and Central Board of Secondary Education. The company's primary business is live online tutoring in STEM, Hindi, English,  Sanskrit, German, French, environmental science and social science. It uses a White Board Audio Video Environment (WAVE) method for their 1-1 student teacher live sessions. It provides test preparation courses for Indian Institute of Technology Joint Entrance Examination (JEE) Foundation, National Talent Search Examination (NTSE), National Eligibility cum Entrance Test (NEET)  and Problem Solving Assessment (PSA). Other courses include Coding, Mathematics, Reading and Public Speaking.

In January 2022, the company joined Byju's, Simplilearn, Unacademy, PrepInsta Prime and upGrad became one of the founding members of IAMAI's India EdTech Consortium. In March 2022, it launched W.A.V.E 2.0, an interactive platform that aims to support Artificial Intelligence/Machine Learning.

Funding
The firm raised its first round of funding after six months of current operational format. It has raised  million from Accel Partners and Tiger Global Management in its series A funding. It plans to utilize the funding in developing technology solutions for tablets and mobile with scalability which can run hundreds of live learning sessions concurrently. Vedantu raised  million in a series B funding round led by Silicon Valley impact investment firm Omidyar Network and also contributed by its existing investor Accel Partners.

On August 29, 2019, Vedantu announced that it has raised  million in a series C financing round for expansion in India.

In July 2020, Vedantu raised  million in funding led by US-based Coatue. With the latest funding, Vedantu's total fund tally stands at over  million. In September 2021, Vedantu raised  million at a post-money valuation of over  million, according to Fintrackr calculation.

Due to reduced funding for Indian startups, Vedantu laid off one hundred employees in July 2022, making 720 redundancies for 2022.

Acquisitions 
 In February 2021, Vedantu made its first acquisition by acquiring Instasolv in an undisclosed deal. Vedantu had invested  million in Instasolv in July 2020.
 In July 2021, it invested in AI-enabled learning platform Pedagogy.

See also
 Byju's
 Doubtnut

References

External links
 Official website

Companies based in Bangalore
Indian educational websites
Distance education institutions based in India
Educational technology companies of India
Online tutoring
Virtual learning environments
Education companies of India
Educational websites
E-learning in India
Indian educational programs
2011 establishments in Karnataka
Indian companies established in 2011
Test preparation companies